Run This Town Web Series is an action-drama created by Charles Clemmons.  The ‘’Series’’ was created and written by Charles Clemmons and included the collaboration of various other writers including Ben Gelera (Producer), Robert O'Connor and Touyee Vang.  Run This Town debuted on YouTube and the official launch party, hosted by Mingle Media TV Network was held on January 9, 2011 at the Screening Room in Los Angeles, California.

Tells the story of a newly formed group, called The Alliance, that consists of the world's top Criminals and Escape Artists, and their mission to take over a corrupt government.   This newly formed team contains members who have spent their whole lives learning how to solve and deal with crime in ways no one has ever thought of.   Now, they are out to take control of the government.

Run This Town was featured in the 2nd annual L.A. Web Series Festival 2011, where several episodes were screened and took home a total of 3 awards in a drama series: for Outstanding Directing in a Drama Series, Outstanding Lead Actress in a Drama Series, and Outstanding Score in a Drama Series.

Synopsis
Run This Town Series tells the story of a newly formed group, called The Alliance, that consists  of the world’s top Criminals and Escape Artists, and their mission to take over a corrupt government.   This newly formed team contains members who have spent their whole lives learning how to solve and deal with crime in ways no one has ever thought of.   Now, they are out to take control of the government.

Episodes

Cast, Crew and Producers

Cast
Jade – Sheree Swanson

Joseph Neal – Richard Harrison

Angel – Latifah Creswell

Ace – Alan Fleury

Hawk – Mori Foster

Angela Neal – Karin Farfan

Agent Logan – Rick Chambers

Crew
Charles Clemmons
Creator, writer, Director
Eric Wahl
Director of Photography, Editor 
Nate Tieman
Camera Operator

Producers
Charles Clemmons Ben Gelera Richard Harrison Amanda Nevarez Stephanie Rojas

References

2010 web series debuts
American drama web series